Zeale scalaris is a species of beetle in the family Cerambycidae. It was described by Francis Polkinghorne Pascoe in 1866. It is known from Colombia, Ecuador, Panama and Peru.

References

Hemilophini
Beetles described in 1866